This is a list of fellows of the Royal Society elected in 1716.

Fellows
 Claudius Amyand (d. 1740)
 Thomas Cartwright (1671–1748)
 Johann Adolph, Baron von Diescau (d. 1767)
 Joseph Hodges (c. 1704–1722)
 Marques de Monte Leone (fl. 1716–1718)
 Henry Nicholson (c. 1681–1733)
 Giovanni Giuseppe, Marquis Orsi (1652–1733)
 Robert Paul (c. 1697–1762)
 Antonio Maria Salvini (1653–1729?)
 William Simon (fl. 1716–1722)
 Otto Christoph Volckra, Count of Heidenreichstein (d. 1734)
 John Churchill Wickstead (d. 1774)

References

1716
1716 in science
1716 in England